The 1935–36 Bradford City A.F.C. season was the 29th in the club's history.

The club finished 12th in Division Two, and reached the 5th round of the FA Cup.

Sources

References

Bradford City A.F.C. seasons
Bradford City